The Wodeyar Express (formerly Tippu Express) is a Superfast train running between Bengaluru and Mysuru in India. It covers a distance of 139 km in 2.5 hours with two stops, one at Mandya and another at a suburb in Bengaluru, Kengeri. South Western Railway launched an information and entertainment system, "Infotainment on Wheels", on the Wodeyar Express. The new infotainment system allows commuters on board to get real-time information on the arrival and departure of trains and view daily news, weather and entertainment.

Name 
This train was originally named as "Tippu Express" after the Sultan of Mysuru Tipu Sultan who ruled the Kingdom of Mysuru and died at the Siege of Seringapatam in 1799. The train was renamed on 7 October 2022, after the royal family of Mysuru, the Wodeyars.

Rake sharing 
It shares its rake with the Siddhaganga Intercity Express & the KSR Bengaluru–Talaguppa Intercity Express.

Day 1 – 12613>20651
Day 2 – 20652>12725
Day 3 – 12726>12614

Timing 
This train leaves Mysuru at 11:30 hrs & reaches Bengaluru at 14:00 hrs and in the opposite direction, leaves Bengaluru at 15:00 hrs  & reaches Mysuru at 17:30 hrs. Previously the train used to depart Mysuru Junction at 11:00 hrs and reach KSR Bengaluru at 13:30 hrs, with the only stop at Mandya. Nowadays, it's reaching Mysuru between 17.15 and 17.30, as the doubling of tracks is completed on this route.

Schedule

12613

Runs daily

12614

Runs daily

Locomotive 
This train is powered by a WAP-7 locomotive from Krishnarajapuram Loco Shed.

References 

Named passenger trains of India
Transport in Mysore
Rail transport in Karnataka
Transport in Bangalore
Express trains in India